Box man or boxman may refer to:

Literature 
 The Box Man, a novel by Kōbō Abe
 The Box Man (manga), a manga by Imiri Sakabashira

Occupation 
 A box man, the slang term for a safecracker
 The boxman, a casino employee who supervises the craps table
 The "box man", a member of the American football chain crew